Ellison Litton Barber is an American journalist and correspondent for NBC News based in New York. She contributes to NBC News, MSNBC and NBC News Now.

Barber was reporting outside of the United States Capitol as a mob attacked and overtook the Capitol building. She remained live on NBC News throughout the evening.

Originally from Atlanta, Georgia, she graduated from Wofford College with a Bachelor of Arts in English in 2012.

Career
Barber joined NBC News as a New York-based correspondent on April 15, 2020. She extensively reported on the 2019-20 coronavirus pandemic in the United States.

She has reported inside COVID ICUs across the country, filing reports from Alaska to Mississippi.

Prior to joining NBC, Barber served as a general assignment reporter and the Prince George's County Deputy Bureau Chief for Washington's CBS affiliate, WUSA.

At WUSA, Barber reported on an array of stories, including the 2015 Washington, D.C., mass killing of the Savopoulos family and their housekeeper Veralicia Figueroa, the March 2016 U.S. Capitol lock-down, and the protests following the shooting of Terrence Sterling.

In April 2017, she joined Fox News as a general assignment correspondent.

In 2019, Barber reported on the political turmoil in Venezuela and the resulting refugee crisis in neighboring countries. She and her crew were reporting on the Venezuela-Colombia border when gunfire erupted near the Simón Bolívar International Bridge and a thirty-minute shootout ensued. Barber was also the first reporter for a U.S.-based English-language network to travel to Maicao, Colombia and cover the UNHCR assistance camp set up to help refugees fleeing the political crisis in Venezuela.

Alexander Ovechkin interview 
While at WUSA, Barber interviewed Washington Capitals' star Alexander Ovechkin during a blizzard. The unintentional encounter went viral.

References

External links

Ellison Barber on Instagram

American television reporters and correspondents
Wofford College alumni
Living people
MSNBC people
NBC News people
Fox News people
American women television journalists
Year of birth missing (living people)